"Thank You for the Music "is a song by ABBA.

Other uses may include:
Thank You for the Music (album), a 1983 ABBA compilation released in the UK and Ireland
Thank You for the Music (box set), a 1994 ABBA box set

ja:サンキュー・フォー・ザ・ミュージック